John Slingsby (born 21 June 1788 at New Windsor, Berkshire; died 2 September 1826 at Cheltenham, Gloucestershire) was an English amateur cricketer.

Career
Slingsby was not attached to any particular club.  He made 2 known appearances in first-class matches in 1815.

References

External sources
 CricketArchive record

1788 births
1826 deaths
English cricketers
English cricketers of 1787 to 1825
Epsom cricketers
Sportspeople from Windsor, Berkshire